Frank Walkinshaw (28 February 1861 – 14 July 1934) was an English first-class cricketer. Walkinshaw played primarily as a wicketkeeper.

Walkinshaw represented Hampshire in three first-class matches in 1885, which was Hampshire's final season with first-class status until the 1895 County Championship. Walkinshaw's debut for the county came against Surrey County Cricket Club, with his second match against the Marylebone Cricket Club and his final first-class match coming against Derbyshire. Behind the stumps Walkinshaw took four catches and made a single stumping.

Walkinshaw died at Bramley, Hampshire on 14 July 1934.

External links
Frank Walkinshaw at Cricinfo
Frank Walkinshaw at CricketArchive

1861 births
1934 deaths
Hong Kong people
English cricketers
Hampshire cricketers
People from Bramley, Hampshire
Wicket-keepers